The 2013 Canadian Track and Field Championships was the year's national championship in outdoor track and field for Canada. It was held from 20 to 23 June at Moncton Stadium in Moncton, New Brunswick. It served as the selection meeting for the 2013 World Championships in Athletics.

Results

Men

Women

References 

NC  Moncton  CAN  20 - 23 June. Tilastopaja. Retrieved 2019-07-06.
CANADIAN CHAMPIONSHIPS MEDALLISTS/ MÉDAILLÉS DES CHAMPIONNATS CANADIENS - Men (archived). Athletics Canada. Retrieved 2019-07-06.
CANADIAN CHAMPIONSHIPS MEDALLISTS/ MÉDAILLÉS DES CHAMPIONNATS CANADIENS - Women (archived). Athletics Canada. Retrieved 2019-07-06.

External links
Athletics Canada website

2013
Canadian Championships
Canadian Track and Field Championships
Canadian Track and Field Championships
Sport in Moncton